Lucas Janus Ravn-Haren (born 13 October 1997) is a Danish footballer who plays as a winger for Fremad Amager.

Club career

Youth career
Haren is a product of HIK and Nordsjælland. He moved to the latter in 2013. He did not make his debut on the first team as he asked for, and decided not to extend his contract. He wanted to play on senior niveau.

HIK
In the quest for senior football, Haren moved to the third-tier Danish 2nd Division club HIK in July 2016. A month after putting on a strong performance against Danish Superliga club Randers in a Danish Cup match, Haren went on a trial with Randers i November 2016, which went successfully.

Randers
On 8 December 2016 it was confirmed, that Haren at the age of 19, had signed a two-year contract with Randers, starting from the new year.

Haren made his debut for the club on 15 March 2017. He started on the bench, but replaced Marvin Pourié in the 89th minute in a 1–0 victory against SønderjyskE in the cup.

He played his first game in the Superliga on 19 March 2017, where he came on the pitch in the 90th minute, replacing Johnny Thomsen, in a 0–1 defeat against SønderjyskE.

Due to the lack of playing time, Haren left the club after terminating his contract by mutual assent on 11 April 2018. He played 7 official games for the club in total.

After leaving the club, Haren trained the rest of the season at his former club HIK.

Return to HIK
After being released by Randers, Haren returned to HIK.

Helsingør
On 4 December 2018, Helsingør announced the signing of Haren on a contract until the summer 2021, starting from 1 January 2019. Haren left the club in the summer 2021, where his contract expired.

Fremad Amager
On 9 July 2021, Haren signed with Fremad Amager.

Private life
Lucas Haren is the son of the former footballer Piotr Haren, who played for FC Copenhagen. His grandad is Janusz Andrzej Haren, who represented Widzew Łódź and B93.

References

External links
 

1997 births
Living people
Danish men's footballers
Association football wingers
Danish Superliga players
Danish 1st Division players
Danish 2nd Division players
Hellerup IK players
Randers FC players
FC Helsingør players
FC Nordsjælland players
Fremad Amager players
Footballers from Copenhagen